Gold Stars 1992–2002: The Juliana Hatfield Collection is a greatest hits album by Juliana Hatfield, released in 2002.  It also includes previously unreleased recordings.

Track listing 
All songs written by Juliana Hatfield except where noted

"Everybody Loves Me But You"
"My Sister"
"Spin The Bottle"
"Universal Heart-Beat"
"Fleur De Lys"
"Mountains Of Love" from the unreleased album God's Foot
"Fade Away" from the unreleased album God's Foot
"Sellout"
"Live It Up"
"Sneaking Around"
"Somebody Is Waiting For Me"
"Cry In The Dark"
"Houseboy" (Juliana Hatfield, Mikey Welsh)
"My Protégée"
"Every Breath You Take" (Sting)
"Only Love Can Break Your Heart"  (Neil Young)
"Don't Walk Away"
"Your Eyes"
"We Will Rise Again"
"Table For One"  (Juliana Hatfield, Brian Vander Ark)

References

Juliana Hatfield albums
2002 greatest hits albums
Albums produced by Scott Litt
Albums produced by Paul Q. Kolderie
Albums produced by Sean Slade
Albums produced by Gary Smith (record producer)
Zoë Records compilation albums